Trevor Anthony Williams (born April 25, 1992) is an American professional baseball pitcher for the Washington Nationals of Major League Baseball (MLB). He has previously played in MLB for the Pittsburgh Pirates, Chicago Cubs and New York Mets.

Amateur career
After graduating from Rancho Bernardo High School, Williams played college baseball at Arizona State University for the Sun Devils from 2011 to 2013. He started 38 games during his career, going 18–8 with a 2.98 earned run average (ERA). In 2012, he played collegiate summer baseball with the Orleans Firebirds of the Cape Cod Baseball League.

Professional career

Miami Marlins
The Miami Marlins selected Williams in the second round of the 2013 Major League Baseball draft. He made his professional debut with the Gulf Coast Marlins and also played for the Batavia Muckdogs and Greensboro Grasshoppers that year. In 12 starts between the three teams he was 0–2 with a 2.38 ERA. Williams started 2014 with the Jupiter Hammerheads, earning Florida State League All-Star honors, and was promoted to the Jacksonville Suns in August. In 26 games started between both clubs he compiled an 8–7 record and 3.13 ERA. In 2015, Williams played for both Jacksonville and the New Orleans Zephyrs, pitching to a 7–10 record and 3.85 ERA in 25 games (24 starts).

Pittsburgh Pirates
On October 24, 2015, the Marlins traded Williams to the Pittsburgh Pirates for Richard Mitchell as compensation for the Marlins hiring Jim Benedict from the Pirates as their new vice president of pitching development. He spent 2016 with the Indianapolis Indians where he was 9–6 with a 2.53 ERA in twenty games (19 starts).

Williams was promoted to the Major Leagues for September call ups in 2016. In  innings pitched for the Pirates, he was 1–1 with a 7.82 ERA.

Williams began 2017 with Pittsburgh as a member of their bullpen. As the season progressed, he was eventually moved into the starting rotation. In 31 games (25 starts) for the Pirates, he compiled a 7–9 record with a 4.07 ERA and 1.31 WHIP. He began 2018 as a member of Pittsburgh's starting rotation. Williams posted a career year, finishing with an ERA of 3.11 in 31 starts, ending the season with a record of 14–10 in  innings. In 2019, Williams had a down year, posting a record of 7–9 with a 5.38 ERA over 26 starts and  innings.

In 2020 he was 2-8 with a 6.18 ERA. He led the NL in home runs allowed (15). On November 20, 2020, Williams was designated for assignment. He elected free agency on November 28.

Chicago Cubs
On February 5, 2021, Williams signed a one-year, $2.5 million contract with the Chicago Cubs. On May 31, Williams was placed on the injured list after undergoing an emergency appendectomy. In 13 games (12 starts) with the Cubs, Williams went 4–2 with a 5.06 ERA across  innings.

New York Mets
On July 30, 2021, Williams was traded to the New York Mets along with Javier Baez and cash considerations in exchange for Pete Crow-Armstrong.

Washington Nationals
On December 10, 2022, Williams signed a two-year, $13 million contract with the Washington Nationals.

Personal life
Williams is a devout Catholic; he is a Knight of Columbus and his heavily-tattooed arms include the initialized motto of the Society of Jesus, "AMDG," and an allusion to Benedict of Nursia.

In November 2014, he married his wife, Jackie. Their son was born in 2015, and their adopted daughter was born in July 2019.

References

External links

1992 births
Living people
Baseball players from San Diego
Major League Baseball pitchers
Pittsburgh Pirates players
Chicago Cubs players
New York Mets players
Arizona State Sun Devils baseball players
Orleans Firebirds players
Gulf Coast Pirates players
Batavia Muckdogs players
Greensboro Grasshoppers players
Jupiter Hammerheads players
Jacksonville Suns players
New Orleans Zephyrs players
Mesa Solar Sox players
Glendale Desert Dogs players
Bradenton Marauders players
Indianapolis Indians players
Syracuse Mets players
Catholics from California
Rancho Bernardo High School alumni